"I Am, I Feel" is the debut single by British pop music duo Alisha's Attic, released in 1996 from their debut album, Alisha Rules the World. It was written by sisters Karen and Shelly Poole and produced by Dave Stewart. The single quickly became a radio and chart hit in the UK, peaking at number 14 on the UK Singles Chart. A music video was also produced to promote the single. Lyrically, the duo has stated that it is about "a woman rebelling against a man" in a relationship gone bad. It was nominated in the category Best Song Musically & Lyrically at the 1997 Ivor Novello Awards.

Chart performance
In the duo's native UK, "I Am, I Feel" debuted at number 15 on the UK Singles Chart on 28 July 1996. The song peaked the following week at number 14. It then dropped to number 15 for two weeks, then number 18 for two more weeks, 25 and finally 35, before leaving the UK top 40 in September. In France, it spent one week on the SNEP Singles Chart, entering at number 40 on 11 January 1997. In Sweden, the single spent eight weeks inside Sverigetopplistan, debuting in September 1996 and peaking three weeks later at number 23. Outside Europe, it peaked at number 18 in Australia.

Critical reception
"I Am, I Feel" received positive reviews from music critics. American magazine Billboard described it as a "engaging pop song", noting "the witty, assertive lyrics [that] show a confident act driven by intelligent songwriting capped with exciting vocals". Daina Darzin from Cash Box stated that it "is well on its way to being a hit." She added that the song "is a great example of the more lighthearted end of this British female duo's quirky, funky sound (kinda like a cross between Kate Bush and Prince) which adds a bit of ska beat to a pretty melody and sarcastic lyrics like "I wanna bite his head off/Yeah that'd be fun."" Caroline Sullivan from The Guardian said in her album review, "Their iron-fist-in-velvet-glove persona is mildly fetching on the kittenish singles I Am, I Said and Alisha Rules the World". A reviewer from Music Week rated it five out of five, picking it as Single of the Week and adding, "This brilliant pop song marks the debut of the Dagenham duo of sisters and should launch them as one of the nation's finest pop hopes. Simply irresistible." The Times complimented it as "catchy", stating that it "made you sing it over and over again!" In 2012, the song was picked as an Official Chart 'Pop Gem'. They noted that to date, it has sold 153,000 copies in the UK.

Track listing
 CD single, France (1996)
"I Am, I Feel" — 4:03
"Angel Eyes" (Live @ The Corbin Hall) — 1:49

 CD single, UK (1996)
"I Am, I Feel" — 4:00
"Angel Eyes" (Live @ The Corbin Hall) — 1:46
"White Room" (Live @ The Corbin Hall) — 4:00
"I Am, I Feel" (Dark Disco Mix) — 8:13

 CD maxi, Japan (1996)
"I Am, I Feel" — 4:00
"Daffodil or a Diamond" (Live @ The Corbin Hall) — 3:36
"I Am, I Feel" (Junior Vasquez Urban Mix) — 5:55
"I Am, I Feel" (Junior Vasquez Urban Beats) — 7:46

Charts

Weekly charts

Year-end charts

Certifications

Release history

References

1996 songs
1996 debut singles
English pop songs
Song recordings produced by Dave Stewart (musician and producer)
Mercury Records singles